Tanya Allen (born 1975) is a Canadian actress, best known as the harried assistant Audrey on the CBC sitcom The Newsroom. At age 15, she began training at the American Academy of Dramatic Arts in New York City. In addition to her film and television work, Allen has also performed on stage with Second City in Los Angeles.

Filmography

Film

Television

Awards and nominations

References

External links

1975 births
Actresses from Toronto
Canadian film actresses
Canadian television actresses
Canadian Screen Award winners
Living people